Ghouls 'n Ghosts, known as  in Japan, is a side-scrolling platform game developed by Capcom, released as an arcade game in 1988 and subsequently ported to a number of home platforms. It is the sequel to Ghosts 'n Goblins and the second game in the Ghosts 'n Goblins series.

It was a commercial success, becoming the eighth highest-grossing arcade game of 1989 in Japan. It was also critically acclaimed, with the Sega Genesis version winning four awards from Electronic Gaming Monthly in 1989, including Best Game of the Year.

Plot
Three years after the events of Ghosts 'n Goblins, the Ghosts have returned with Ghouls for revenge, initiating a mortal holocaust on the Princess' kingdom as beams of light struck through countless villagers. When Sir Arthur returns to the village, his rescue attempt was too soon as his beloved Princess Prin-Prin also has her soul taken away from her body in front of his very eyes. Now it's up to the heroic knight once again to slay his way to the hellish castle to defeat the evil Lucifer and his legion of demons and restore the souls of Prin-Prin and every mortal.

Gameplay

The gameplay for Ghouls 'n Ghosts is similar to that of Ghosts 'n Goblins. The player controls the knight Arthur, who must advance through a series of eerie levels and defeat a number of undead and demonic creatures in his quest to restore all the people killed by Lucifer (Loki in the English-language Sega Genesis and Master System versions), including his beloved Princess Prin-Prin, back to life. Along the way, Arthur can pick up a variety of weapons and armor to help him in his quest. While the core gameplay remains the same as its predecessor, the game now allows Arthur to fire directly upward and directly downward while in mid air.

By jumping in certain spots, players can cause a treasure chest to erupt from the ground. By firing his weapon at the chest, players may uncover new weapons, gold armor or an evil magician that changes Arthur into an elderly man or a helpless duck. The gold armor allows players to charge up the weapon to release a powerful magical attack. Each weapon has its own special attack, with the exception of the special weapon (see below).
 
There are six levels. To defeat the game, Arthur must complete levels 1 through 5 twice. Upon completing them the first time, Arthur is taken back to level 1, but this time a special weapon appears during the game. To enter Lucifer's chamber the player must have this special weapon equipped, and must have defeated the final Fly boss from level 5. After entering the final large door, the player goes directly to Lucifer's chamber.

Music
The original soundtrack for the arcade version was composed by Tamayo Kawamoto. Many computer ports of the game include the soundtrack by Tim Follin which consists of arrangements and some new songs. Follin's soundtrack – especially Commodore 64, Atari ST (which both implement each machines' 'chiptune' synthesizers, although the selection of pieces and some scoring differs slightly between computers) and Amiga versions (of which the playlist is again slightly different) – is respected among computer game music listeners and also gained appreciation from reviewers when the game was published.

Versions
Versions of Ghouls 'n Ghosts were released in Europe in 1989 for the Amstrad CPC, Amiga, Atari ST, Commodore 64, and ZX Spectrum. These versions were all handled by Software Creations and all omit a great deal of detail from the arcade version.

A Sega Genesis conversion of Ghouls 'n Ghosts (programmed by Yuji Naka) was released by Sega in 1989 in Japan and North America, and in 1990 in Europe. This version was re-released as a handheld TV game with Street Fighter II: Special Champion Edition in 2005 and as a downloadable Virtual Console game for the Wii in 2007. This version was also included on the Sega Genesis Mini in 2019. Sega also released a Master System conversion in 1990. This version introduced a power-up system that allows the player to enter secret shops and upgrade parts of their armor. This includes helmets, which give the player access to new weapons and magic spells; chest armor, which allows the player to sustain more damage; and boots, which increase the player's speed.

A SuperGrafx conversion of Dai Makaimura was released by NEC Avenue in 1990. This version was included on the TurboGrafx-16 Mini in 2020. A version of Dai Makaimura was released by Capcom in 1994 for the Sharp X68000.

A version for the Capcom Power System Changer was planned and previewed but never released.

In 1998, Capcom released Capcom Generation 2 for the PlayStation and Saturn in Japan, a compilation which included Ghouls 'n Ghosts along with Ghosts 'n Goblins and Super Ghouls 'n Ghosts. The PlayStation version of this compilation was released as a bundle in Europe with three other volumes titled Capcom Generations (in plural) under the title of Capcom Generations: Chronicles of Arthur. Capcom later released in North America Capcom Classics Collection Vol. 1 for the PlayStation 2 and Xbox in 2005 and Capcom Classics Collection: Reloaded for the PlayStation Portable in 2006, which includes all the Capcom Generations titles. The arcade version of Ghouls 'n Ghosts was re-released as one of the included games on the Capcom Home Arcade console in 2019.

Reception

Commercial performance
In Japan, Game Machine listed Ghouls 'n Ghosts on their January 15, 1989 issue as being the second most-successful table arcade unit of the month, outperforming titles like Image Fight and Truxton. It went on to become the eighth highest-grossing arcade game of 1989 in Japan.

Contemporary reviews
MegaTech magazine reviewed the Sega Mega Drive version, calling it "a truly superb game" and "a stunning conversion" of the "classic coin-op, combining stunning graphics and sound with very challenging gameplay."

Accolades
The Sega Genesis version received the 1989 Electronic Gaming Monthly awards for Best Game of the Year, Best Graphics, Best Sequel and Coolest Boss. The Computer Entertainer Awards selected it as the Genesis Game of the Year. VideoGames & Computer Entertainment gave it the award for the best coin-op conversion on consoles. The Computer Entertainer Awards selected it as the Genesis Game of the Year.

ACE magazine listed it as one of the top four best games available for the Mega Drive in 1989. It received a Hyper Game award from MegaTech, as well as a Gold Medal from Zzap!64, Crash Smash award from Crash, and C+VG Hit award from Computer and Video Games.

In 1992, Mega magazine ranked it as the 23rd best game of all time. In 1997, Electronic Gaming Monthly ranked the Genesis version as the 48th best console video game of all time, citing its close recreation of the arcade version. In 2017, Gamesradar listed the game 44th on its "Best Sega Genesis/Mega Drive games of all time."

Retrospective
Retrospectively, Game Rankings gave the Sega Genesis version an aggregate rating of 80% based on four reviews published online in the 2000s, including three reviews for the Wii Virtual Console release.

The Virtual Console release (ported from the Sega Genesis) was rated 6.5 out of 10 by GameSpot, 7.5 out of 10 by IGN, and 9 out of 10 stars by Nintendo Life.

References

External links

Ghouls 'n Ghosts at MobyGames

1988 video games
Amiga games
Amstrad CPC games
Arcade video games
Atari ST games
Cancelled Capcom Power System Changer games
Commodore 64 games
CP System games
Dark fantasy video games
Video games about ghosts
Ghosts 'n Goblins
Horror video games
Master System games
Mobile games
Platform games
PlayStation Network games
Sega Genesis games
X68000 games
SuperGrafx games
U.S. Gold games
Video game sequels
Video games developed in Japan
Video games scored by Tamayo Kawamoto
Video games scored by Tim Follin
Video games set in castles
Virtual Console games
Video games about zombies
Run and gun games
ZX Spectrum games